The Treasure of the Aztecs (German: Der Schatz der Azteken) is a 1965 western adventure film directed by Robert Siodmak and starring Lex Barker, Gérard Barray and Michèle Girardon. It was made as a co-production between France, Italy and West Germany. It was based on a novel by Karl May, part of a boom in adaptations of the author's works during the decade. It was followed by a second part The Pyramid of the Sun God (1965).

It was shot at the Spandau Studios in Berlin and on location in Barcelona and Yugoslavia. The film sets were designed by the art directors Hertha Hareiter and Otto Pischinger. It was made in Eastmancolor.

Cast
Lex Barker as Dr. Karl Sternau
Gérard Barray as Count Alfonso di Rodriganda y Sevilla
Rik Battaglia as Captain Lazaro Verdoja
Michèle Girardon as Josefa Cortejo
Alessandra Panaro as Rosita Arbellez
Theresa Lorca as Karja 
Ralf Wolter as Andreas Hasenpfeffer
Fausto Tozzi as Benito Juarez
Hans Nielsen as Don Pedro Arbellez
Gustavo Rojo as Lieutenant Potoca
Kelo Henderson as Frank Wilson
Jean-Roger Caussimon as Marshal Bazaine
Friedrich von Ledebur as Count Fernando di Rodriganda y Sevilla
Vladimir Popovic as Black Deer
Jeff Corey as Abraham Lincoln
Djordje Nenadovic as Count Embarez

See also
 The Pyramid of the Sun God (1965)
 Karl May movies

References

Bibliography 
 Bergfelder, Tim. International Adventures: German Popular Cinema and European Co-Productions in the 1960s. Berghahn Books, 2005.

External links
 

1965 films
1965 Western (genre) films
German Western (genre) films
French Western (genre) films
West German films
1960s German-language films
Films based on works by Karl May
Films set in 1864
Films set in Mexico
Films set in Washington, D.C.
Films shot in Montenegro
Films shot in Yugoslavia
Second French intervention in Mexico films
Gloria Film films
1960s historical adventure films
German historical adventure films
French historical adventure films
Italian historical adventure films
Films shot at Spandau Studios
Films directed by Robert Siodmak
1960s Italian films
1960s French films
1960s German films